Olga Nida Carmena Nardone (June 8, 1921 – September 24, 2010) was an actress and one of the last surviving Munchkins from the 1939 film The Wizard of Oz, in which she played a member of the Lullaby League. She was known as "Little Olga" and "Princess Olga" and was one of the smallest of the Wizard of Oz Munchkins, standing at just 3 foot 4 inches (101.6 cm) tall. The fact that she had done ballet solos in vaudeville helped get her the part.

Biography
She was born on June 8, 1921, in Newton, Massachusetts to  Louise M. and Leonardo B. Nardone. She died on September 24, 2010, in Nonantum, Massachusetts of natural causes, at the age of 89 years.

References

External links

1921 births
2010 deaths
American film actresses
Actors from Lowell, Massachusetts
Actresses from Massachusetts
Vaudeville performers
Actors with dwarfism
21st-century American women